Dolgoma xanthocraspis is a moth of the family Erebidae. It is found in eastern India and southern and central China.

References

Moths described in 1900
Dolgoma